Prapan Duangchaoom (born 22 October 1944) is a Thai former boxer who competed in the 1968 Summer Olympics.

References

1944 births
Living people
Flyweight boxers
Prapan Duangchaoom
Boxers at the 1968 Summer Olympics
Asian Games medalists in boxing
Boxers at the 1966 Asian Games
Prapan Duangchaoom
Prapan Duangchaoom
Medalists at the 1966 Asian Games
Prapan Duangchaoom